Alvas Elvis Powell (born 18 July 1994) is a Jamaican professional footballer who plays as a right-back for Major League Soccer club FC Cincinnati. A native of the parish St. Thomas, he attended Paul Bogle High School and gained recognition in the Da Costa Cup competition.

Club career

Portmore United
Powell began his career with Portmore United; he made his senior debut after January 2012. In 2013, Powell went out on loan to Portland Timbers in the MLS, which was extended through December 2014. On 30 August 2014, he scored his first goal for the Timbers in a 3–0 win against the Vancouver Whitecaps.

FC Cincinnati
On 27 December 2018, Powell was traded to FC Cincinnati ahead of their 2019 season, in exchange for $250,000 of General Allocation Money.

Inter Miami CF
On 19 November 2019, Powell was selected second overall by Inter Miami in the 2019 MLS Expansion Draft. Miami opted to decline his contract option following the 2020 season.

Al-Hilal Club
On 27 January 2021, Powell signed with Sudan Premier League side Al-Hilal Club. On 30 March 2021, Powell, through his agent, requested have his contract with the club terminated due to his "inability to cope with the atmosphere in Sudan."

Philadelphia Union
After training with the club in May and June, Powell signed a one-year deal with Philadelphia Union on 10 June 2021. On June 23, Powell debuted for the Union as a substitute in a 1–0 win over visiting Columbus Crew SC. Following the 2021 season, Powell's contract option was declined by Philadelphia.

Return to FC Cincinnati
On 17 December 2021, Powell re-joined former club FC Cincinnati ahead of their 2022 season. At the conclusion of the season, Cincinnati announced they were exercising Powell's contract option, keeping him at the club through the 2023 season.

International career 
He made his international debut with the Jamaica national team in 2012. He previously played at the 2011 FIFA U-17 World Cup. He helped the Reggae Boyz to capture the 2014 CFU Caribbean Football Unions (men's) title beating Trinidad and Tobago in penalties.

Personal life
In 2015, Powell received his U.S. green card which qualifies him as a domestic player for MLS roster purposes.

Career statistics

International goals
Scores and results list Jamaica's goal tally first.

Honors

Jamaica
 Caribbean Cup winner: 2014

Portmore United
 Jamaica National Premier League: 2012

Portland Timbers
 MLS Cup: 2015
 Western Conference (playoffs): 2015

References

1994 births
Living people
Jamaican footballers
Jamaican expatriate footballers
Jamaica international footballers
Association football defenders
Portmore United F.C. players
Portland Timbers players
Portland Timbers 2 players
Sacramento Republic FC players
FC Cincinnati players
Inter Miami CF players
Philadelphia Union players
Major League Soccer players
USL Championship players
National Premier League players
People from Saint Thomas Parish, Jamaica
Expatriate soccer players in the United States
Jamaican expatriate sportspeople in the United States
2014 Caribbean Cup players
2015 CONCACAF Gold Cup players
2017 CONCACAF Gold Cup players
2019 CONCACAF Gold Cup players
2021 CONCACAF Gold Cup players